A statue of painter John Singleton Copley by Lewis Cohen is installed in Boston's Copley Square, in the U.S. state of Massachusetts. The bronze sculpture was installed in 2002.

A booklet published by the Friends of Copley Square describes the process of creating the statue.

See also

 2002 in art

References

Sources

External links
 
 John Singleton Copley at Friends of Copley Square
 John Singleton Copley – Boston, MA at Waymarking

2002 establishments in Massachusetts
2002 sculptures
Back Bay, Boston
Bronze sculptures in Massachusetts
Monuments and memorials in Boston
Outdoor sculptures in Boston
Sculptures of men in Massachusetts
Statues in Boston